John, Johnny, Jonathan, or Jon Gordon may refer to:

Arts and entertainment
 John Watson Gordon (1788–1864), Scottish portrait painter and a president of the Royal Scottish Academy
 John Gordon (trombonist) (born 1939), American jazz trombonist
 Jon Gordon (musician) (born 1966), American jazz saxophonist
 John Gordon (scenic artist) (c. 1874–1911), in Australia, son of George Gordon
 John Gordon (songwriter) (born 1963), Australian singer-songwriter and music producer
 , wrote "Satellite (Lena Meyer-Landrut song)", 2010 
 John Gordon (author) (1925–2017), English writer of teenage supernatural fiction
 John R. Gordon (born 1964), English screenwriter
 Jon Henry Gordon, makeup artist

Military
 John Gordon (militia captain) (1759–1819), American Appalachian pioneer and Indian fighter
 John Gordon (Royal Navy officer) (1792–1869), court-martialed after HMS America incident
 John William Gordon (1814–1870), British Army officer and Inspector-General of Engineers
 John B. Gordon (1832–1904), Confederate general, Georgia governor, U.S. senator
SS John B. Gordon, a Liberty ship
 John James Hood Gordon (1832–1908), British Army general
 John Rutherford Gordon (1895–1978), Australian fighter pilot in World War I
 John A. Gordon (born 1946), deputy director of the CIA, Homeland Security advisor
 John E. Gordon, judge advocate general of the U.S. Navy, 1990–1992
 John de la Hay Gordon, British army officer, administrator and diplomat

Nobility
 John Gordon, Lord Gordon (died 1517), Scottish nobleman
 John Gordon, 11th Earl of Sutherland (1525–1567), Scottish magnate
 John Gordon, 13th Earl of Sutherland, Scottish landowner and courtier
 Sir John Gordon of Lochinvar, Scottish courtier and landowner
 John Gordon, 1st Viscount of Kenmure (1599–1634), Scottish nobleman and founder of the town of New Galloway
 John Gordon, 14th Earl of Sutherland (1609–1679), Scottish peer
 Sir John Gordon, 1st Baronet, of Haddo (1610–1644), Scottish Royalist supporter of Charles I
 Sir John Gordon, 2nd Baronet, of Haddo (died 1665)
 John Gordon, 3rd Earl of Aboyne (died 1732)
 John Gordon, 16th Earl of Sutherland (1661–1733), Scottish nobleman and politician
 John Gordon, 7th/10th Viscount of Kenmure (1750–1840), Viscount of Kenmure
 John Hamilton-Gordon, 1st Marquess of Aberdeen and Temair (1847–1934), Scottish Liberal politician and colonial governor

Politics
 John Gordon (Aberdeen MP) (c. 1655–1730), Scottish MP 1708–1710
John Gordon of Glenbucket, Scottish Jacobite
 John Gordon (soldier) (c. 1776–1858), MP for Weymouth and Melcombe Regis
 John Gordon (South Londonderry MP) (1849–1922), Irish MP 1900–1916
 John Gordon (Conservative politician) (1850–1915), MP for Elginshire and Nairnshire, 1895–1906, and Brighton, 1911–1914
 Sir John Hannah Gordon (1850–1923), South Australian politician and judge
 John Gordon (Victorian politician) (1858–1937), Australian politician
 John Fawcett Gordon (1879–1965), MP in the Northern Ireland parliament for Antrim and Carrick
 Peter Gordon (politician) (John Bowie Gordon, 1921–1991), New Zealand politician
 John Gordon (union leader), president of Public Service Alliance of Canada
 Jack Gordon (official greeter) (John F. Gordon, 1921–2010), Seattle civic activist
 John William Gordon (trade unionist) (1879–?), Irish trade union official and political activist

Religion
 John Gordon (archbishop) (1912–1981), Irish diplomat of the Holy See
 John Gordon (bishop) (1544–1619), Scottish bishop and Dean of Salisbury
 John Clement Gordon (1644–1726), Scottish bishop, Jacobite, and Catholic convert
 John Gordon (priest) (1726–1793), Anglican priest

Sports
 John Gordon (rugby union) (1849–1934), Scottish international rugby union player
 John Gordon (Scottish footballer) (1886–1971), Scottish footballer
 John Gordon (referee) (1930–2000), Scottish football referee
 Johnny Gordon (1931–2001), English football player who played mostly with Portsmouth and Birmingham City
 John Gordon (sportscaster) (born 1940), American radio announcer for the Minnesota Twins Major League baseball team
 John Gordon (badminton) (born 1978), New Zealand badminton player
 John Gordon (English cricketer) (1886–1933), English cricketer
 John Gordon (Jamaican cricketer) (born 1956), Jamaican cricketer
 John Gordon (curler) (born 1958), American Olympic curler

Other
 John Gordon (merchant) (c. 1710–1778), British Loyalist merchant and trader of Scottish origin
 John Gordon (convict) (died 1845), last person executed by Rhode Island
 John Gordon (anatomist) (1786–1818), Scottish physician and anatomist
 John Thomson Gordon (1813–1865), Scottish advocate
 John Gordon (journalist) (1890–1974), Scottish newspaper editor and columnist
 John Steele Gordon (born 1944), American business and economics writer
 Jon Gordon, American business writer
 A pseudonym used by Randall Garrett

See also
 Jack Gordon (disambiguation)
 Jean Gordon (disambiguation), for the French version of the name